No Longer Enemy Combatant (NLEC) is a term used by the U.S. military for a group of 38 Guantanamo detainees whose Combatant Status Review Tribunal (CSRT) determined they were not "enemy combatants". None of them were released right away.  Ten of them were allowed to move to the more comfortable Camp Iguana. Others, such as Sami Al Laithi, remained in solitary confinement.

Thirty-eight detainees were finally classified as NLECs.
The fifth Denbeaux report, "No-hearing hearings", reported that an additional three Combatant Status Review Tribunals determined that captives should not have been determined to have been enemy combatants, only to have their recommendation overturned.

The Washington Post has published a list of the names of 30 of the 38 individuals who were determined not to have been enemy combatants.

The delay in the release of some of the detainees was said to be due to considerations of their safety.  Some could not be returned to their home countries, out of fears of retaliation from their fellow citizens, or from the governments of their countries.  Some, like Al Laithi, were returned to their home countries after the US secured a promise that they would not be punished by their home countries.  Others, like five of the Uyghur detainees in Guantanamo, were released when the US found a third country which would accept them.

Three further captives who had been determined not to have been enemy combatants, who had been occupants of Camp Iguana since May 2005, were released in Albania in November 2006.

Multiple CSRTs

The fifth Denbeaux study, entitled "No-hearing hearings", revealed that some Guantanamo captives had second or third Combatant Status Review Tribunals convened when their first tribunal determined that they had not been enemy combatants after all.

H. Candace Gorman, the pro bono lawyer for Abdel Hamid Ibn Abdussalem Ibn Mifta Al Ghazzawi, expressed surprise when she learned that her client had initially been determined not to have been an enemy combatant, after all.  Gorman described traveling to the secure site in Virginia, the only place where lawyers were allowed to review their clients' classified files.  She was told that the justification for convening her client's second tribunal had been that the DoD had new evidence. However, when she reviewed the transcript of his second tribunal she found that there had been no new evidence.

Lieutenant Colonel Stephen Abraham came forward and swore an affidavit, describing his experience sitting on Al Ghazzawi's tribunal. It was critical of the process, including the pressure exerted to find against the detainee.

NLEC captives

On 19 November 2007, the Department of Defense published a list of the 38 men finally deemed to be no longer enemy combatants in 2004.

On 17 January 2009, Carol Rosenberg, writing in the Miami Herald, quoted Guantanamo spokesman Jeffrey Gordon, that a panel of officers had recently reviewed Bismullah's "enemy combatant" status, and determined, "based on new evidence", that he was not an enemy combatant after all.
Bismullah was released to Afghanistan on 17 January.

See also
Seton Hall study
Statelessness
Lists of former Guantanamo Bay detainees alleged to have returned to terrorism
Timeline of the release and transfer of Guantanamo Bay detainees

References

Law of war
Guantanamo Bay captives legal and administrative procedures